The Scanning Multichannel Microwave Radiometer (SMMR) [pronounced simmer] was a five-frequency microwave radiometer flown on the Seasat and Nimbus 7 satellites. Both were launched in 1978, with the Seasat mission lasting less than six months until failure of the primary bus. The Nimbus 7 SMMR lasted from 25 October 1978 until 20 August 1987. It measured dual-polarized microwave radiances, at 6.63, 10.69, 18.0, 21.0, and 37.0 GHz, from the Earth's atmosphere and surface. Its primary legacy has been the creation of areal sea-ice climatologies for the Arctic and Antarctic.

The final few months of operation were considerably fortuitous as they allowed the calibration of the radiometers and their products with the first results from the SSMI.

References
Jezek, K.C., C. Merry, D. Cavalieri, S.Grace, J. Bedner, D. Wilson and D. Lampkin 1991: Comparison between SMMR and SSM/I passive microwave data collected over the Antarctic Ice Sheet.  Byrd Polar Research Center, The Ohio State university, Columbus, OH., BPRC Technical Report Number 91-03, .

External links
 http://nsidc.org/data/nsidc-0071.html
 https://web.archive.org/web/20060930044535/http://podaac.jpl.nasa.gov:2031/SENSOR_DOCS/smmr.html
 http://ieeexplore.ieee.org/xpls/abs_all.jsp?isnumber=25768&arnumber=1145458&type=ref

Satellite meteorology
Radiometry
Earth observation satellite sensors